Crayford & Bexleyheath Stadium was a greyhound racing and motorcycle speedway stadium in the London Borough of Bexley.

Origins and Opening 

In 1930 the Bexleyheath and District Motorcycle Club started making plans for a grass speedway track on land known as the Crayford Fairfield that had hosted travelling fairs for a reported 500 years. The first speedway meeting was held in the spring of 1930 but the following season (1931) it was decided to postpone any further speedway meetings due to the work involved in organising them. A company called Wilson Greyhound Racing Track Ltd stepped in and built a 450-yard circuit around the grass track and racing duly opened on Easter Monday 1932. Speedway returned in 1932 with a new cinder track inside the dog track and it was known as the Crayford Speedway Stadium until 1937.

Renovation 
In 1937 builders W & C French undertook a huge rebuilding project for the Crayford & Bexleyheath Greyhound Stadium Ltd company costing £50,000. The project included a new greyhound track, two glass fronted grandstands and a restaurant all under cover but sadly for the speedway there was no provision made. The build came across a human skull believed to be over 300 years old when a workman was digging foundations for the greyhound kennels and this gained the attention of archaeologists.

The new opening was on 10 July 1937 with the distances created being 462, 650 and 880 yards and the running surface was a deep peat which would soon gain a reputation for being helpful to greyhounds with toe and foot ailments. There were some early problems and in particular the track suffered at the hands of dopers, two such events in 1941 and 1946 resulted in prison sentences for several individuals and the track was forced to employ a private security force.

History
In 1955 Henry Parsons was employed by the track and trained all of the greyhounds racing there. In 1964 the ownership of the stadium changed from Northumbrian and Crayford Trust Ltd to the group known as the Totalisator Holdings Group (THG), owners of three other tracks at the time (Gosforth, Leeds and Brough Park). The company became the second biggest greyhound industry operator behind the Greyhound Racing Association (GRA). In 1967 the Crayford Vase was introduced as the tracks first major event.

Crayford became the first track in the United Kingdom to adopt the United States system of employing contracted trainers instead of trainers being based in stadium kennels and being paid as direct employees of the track. Two of the four current trainers Bill Westcott and former Arms Park trainer Paddy Coughlan already trained from their own kennels. Terry O'Sullivan and Eric Parsons moved to other kennels in Kent. The new system left Henry Parsons with no kennels so he joined the racing office staff and John Honeysett and John Gibbons soon join the training ranks.

Ladbrokes bought THG in 1974 and Arthur Aldridge became racing director. Three years later the peat surface was replaced with sand and Tony Smith replaced Jim Simpson as Racing Manager in 1975.

Speedway

The Crayford Kestrels were a Speedway team which operated from 1968 until their closure in 1983 when they transferred the promotion to Hackney. Initially nicknamed the 'Highwaymen' from 1968 until they closed in 1970, the track re-opened in 1975 and the team were nicknamed the Kestrels. The team were forced to relocate for the 1984 season as the stadium was sold for redevelopment. The Kestrels were National League Four-Team Champions in 1980.

Closure
News emerged in 1984 that there were plans for rebuilding the entire stadium as part of a development project by Ladbrokes. The twenty-acre site would be redeveloped, with five acres of it being converted into a new greyhound track and sports stadium. Racing ended on 18 May 1985 and work began on the new five-acre site with the new stadium named Crayford Stadium.

Achievements 
The Henry Parsons trained Malanna Mace won the 1952 Test and the Northern 700 and finished runner up in the St Leger final. The following year he won the Wembley Gold Cup. John Honeysett won the Trainers championship in 1979 after the event was hosted by the track. The Honeysett trained Corduroy reached the 1980 English Greyhound Derby final, a feat repeated by Honeysett the following year with Clohast Flame. Flying Pursuit trained by John Gibbons won the 1980 Laurels and Sugarville Pat claimed the Pall Mall Stakes in 1982, Flying Duke took the Grand Prix in 1983 and Amenhotep won the Laurels in 1984 for Linda Mullins.

Competitions

Crayford Vase
The Crayford Vase was inaugurated at the track in 1967. It switched to the new stadium in 1987.
Past Winners (up until 1985)

(1967–1984 held at Crayford & Bexleyheath over 490 yards/462 metres)

Track records

Pre-Metric track records

Post-Metric track records

References

Defunct greyhound racing venues in the United Kingdom
Defunct speedway venues in England
Sport in the London Borough of Bexley